Fred Barnett (13 April 1896 – 1982) was an English professional footballer who played for Hawley, Northfleet United, Tottenham Hotspur, Southend United, Watford and Dartford.

Football career
After playing for Hawley, Barnett joined Bolton Wanderers in 1919 on trial. He went on to join the Spurs in 1920 before playing for the club's nursery side Northfleet United. The outside right became a Tottenham Hotspur player in 1922 and featured in 16 matches and scoring once. Barnett signed for Southend United and between 1929–33 he played 174 matches and scored on 35 occasions. Barnett signed for Watford in 1934 before ending his career at Dartford.

References

1896 births
1982 deaths
Sportspeople from Dartford
English footballers
English Football League players
Tottenham Hotspur F.C. players
Southend United F.C. players
Watford F.C. players
Dartford F.C. players
Northfleet United F.C. players
Association football outside forwards